The 2004 All-Ireland Under-21 Football Championship was the 41st staging of the All-Ireland Under-21 Football Championship since its establishment by the Gaelic Athletic Association in 1964.

Dublin entered the championship as defending champions, however, they were defeated by Kildare in the Leinster final replay.

On 2 October 2004, Armagh won the championship following a 2-8 to 1-9 defeat of Mayo in the All-Ireland final. This was their first All-Ireland title.

Results

All-Ireland Under-21 Football Championship

Semi-finals

Final

Statistics

Miscellaneous

 The All-Ireland semi-final between Armagh and Cork is the first ever championship meeting between the two teams.

References

2004
All-Ireland Under-21 Football Championship